Toshifumi is a masculine Japanese given name.

Possible writings
Toshifumi can be written using different combinations of kanji characters. Some examples:

敏文, "agile, literature"
敏史, "agile, history"
敏郁, "agile, aroma/progress"
俊文, "talented, literature"
俊史, "talented, history"
俊郁, "talented, aroma/progress"
利文, "benefit, literature"
利史, "benefit, history"
利郁, "benefit, aroma/progress"
年文, "year, literature"
年史, "year, history"
寿文, "long life, literature"
寿史, "long life, history"

The name can also be written in hiragana としふみ or katakana トシフミ.

Notable people with the name
, Japanese baseball player.
, Japanese politician.
, CEO of the Orix Ceramic Limited Company.
, Japanese chief executive.
, Japanese television announcer.
, Japanese medical scientist and professor of medical genetics.

Japanese masculine given names